Shiyan Xu (born 15 March 1997) is a Chinese judoka. In 2021, she competed in the women's +78 kg event at the 2020 Summer Olympics in Tokyo, Japan.

She is the gold medallist of the 2021 Judo Grand Slam Tbilisi in the +78 kg category.

References

External links
 
 

1997 births
Living people
Chinese female judoka
Judoka at the 2020 Summer Olympics
Olympic judoka of China
20th-century Chinese women
21st-century Chinese women